Bad Subject is a 1933 Italian comedy film directed by Carlo Ludovico Bragaglia and starring Vittorio De Sica. It is a remake of The Devil to Pay! (1930).

Cast
 Vittorio De Sica as Willy
 Giuditta Rissone as Susanna, Willy's Sister
 Laura Nucci as Mary of Varietà
 Guglielmo Barnabò as Doraìs Uncle
 Amelia Chellini as Dora's Aunt

References

External links

1933 films
1933 comedy films
1930s Italian-language films
Italian black-and-white films
Films directed by Carlo Ludovico Bragaglia
Italian comedy films
Italian remakes of foreign films
Remakes of American films
1930s Italian films